Walnut Creek Bridge may refer to:

 Walnut Creek Bridge (Simmons, Arizona), listed on the National Register of Historic Places in Yavapai County, Arizona
 Walnut Creek Bridge (Heizer, Kansas), listed on the National Register of Historic Places in Barton County, Kansas
 Walnut Creek Bridge (Wellsville, Kansas), listed on the National Register of Historic Places in Franklin County, Kansas